Rolepa marginepicta is a moth in the Phiditiidae family. It was described by Paul Dognin in 1914.

References

Bombycoidea
Moths described in 1914